One Snow Hill Plaza (also known as Kennedy Tower) is a highrise hotel in Birmingham, England. In 2013 the building was renovated and became a 224-room hotel under the brand Holiday Inn Express.

It receives the name Kennedy Tower from the mural dedicated to John F. Kennedy which was located in Snow Hill Circus until it was moved in mid-2006.

It was redeveloped and modernised externally in previous years to be better suited to the environment which it will be a part of which will see the construction of Snowhill, a major mixed-use development adjacent to Snow Hill station. It forms a prominent addition on the skyline when viewed from the north.

In November 2007, Kenmore Property Ltd. announced plans to demolish the tower and replace it with a  office tower, by holding a public consultation for the proposal. The plans superseded an earlier proposal for a 12-storey office tower on the site 2 Snow Hill Plaza, adjacent to Lloyd House. This would make it the largest office tower outside London. Construction was expected to start in 2009 and to be completed in 2011. However, Kenmore later applied for the scheme to be divided into two phases with the first phase being constructed on the site of 2 Snow Hill Plaza, allowing for the  tower to be constructed alongside at a later date. This was approved. However, in November 2009, Kenmore Property Group were placed into administration. Rob Caven and Martin Ellis of Grant Thornton were appointed joint administrators of 21 of Kenmore's companies, and joint receivers of two others. The Snow Hill Plaza site was formally put on the market by the administrators in March 2010.

See also
List of tall buildings in Birmingham

References

Emporis: Kenmore’s £230-million Gateway vision gets the go-ahead Dated: 2008-03-05
Emporis: Kenmore announces £230 million gateway vision Dated: 2008-01-19

External links
Project Landmark
Emporis entry
Skyscrapernews entry
Emporis entry on the proposed building

Buildings and structures in Birmingham, West Midlands
Hotel buildings completed in 1973